is a railway station on the Iwate Ginga Railway Line in the city of Takizawa, Iwate Prefecture, Japan, operated by the third-sector railway operator Iwate Ginga Railway Company.

Lines
Takizawa Station is served by the Iwate Ginga Railway Line, and is located 12.2 kilometers from the starting point of the line at Morioka Station, and 547.5 kilometers from Tokyo Station.

Station layout
Takizawa Station has one island platform and one side platform serving three tracks, connected to the station building by a footbridge. The station is staffed.

A special fenced area for rail enthusiasts and photographers, called "Takizawa Station Train Spotters", was set up at the south end of platform 2/3 on 14 October 2017.

Platforms

History
Takizawa Station opened on 21 January 1906. The station building was rebuilt in September 1967. The station was absorbed into the JR East network upon the privatization of the Japanese National Railways (JNR) on 1 April 1987, and was transferred to the Iwate Ginga Railway on 1 September 2002.

Passenger statistics
In fiscal 2015, the station was used by an average of 3,095 passengers daily.

Surrounding area
 Iwate Prefectural University
 Morioka University

See also
 List of railway stations in Japan

References

External links

  

Railway stations in Iwate Prefecture
Iwate Galaxy Railway Line
Railway stations in Japan opened in 1906
Takizawa, Iwate